Odaxelagnia is a paraphilia involving sexual arousal through biting, or being bitten. Odaxelagnia is considered a mild form of sadomasochism. Alfred Kinsey studied Odaxelagnia, reporting that roughly half of all people surveyed had experienced sexual arousal from biting.

References

Sexual fetishism

Paraphilias